Vilajuïga is a municipality in the comarca of Alt Empordà, Girona, Catalonia, Spain.

Vilajuïga's area is home to a group of Megalithic dolmens. Starting from the 10th century AD it was a possession of the monastery of Sant Pere de Rodes. In the nearby is also the Quermançó Castle, documented from 1073.

The mineral water, Aigua de Vilajuïga, comes from here. It was reputed to be the only water drunk by the surrealist painter Salvador Dalí.

References

External links
 Government data pages 

Municipalities in Alt Empordà
Populated places in Alt Empordà